Eryonidae is a family of fossil decapod crustaceans which lived from the Upper Triassic to the Lower Cretaceous. It contains four genera: An aggregation of three unidentified eryonids was reported in 2012 inside a Late Jurassic ammonoid of the species Harpoceras falciferum; they represent the earliest evidence of gregarious behaviour in decapods.
Cycleryon Glaessner, 1965
Eryon A. G. Desmarest, 1817
Knebelia Van Straelen, 1922
Rosenfeldia Garassino, Teruzzi & Dalla Vecchia, 1996

References

External links

Polychelida